San Pietro in Montorio (Saint Peter on the Golden Mountain) is a church in Rome, Italy, which includes in its courtyard the Tempietto, a small commemorative martyrium (tomb) built by Donato Bramante.

History
The Church of San Pietro in Montorio was built on the site of an earlier 9th-century church dedicated to Saint Peter on Rome's Janiculum hill. It serves as a shrine, marking the supposed site of St. Peter's crucifixion.

In the 15th century, the ruins were given to the Amadist friars, a reform branch of the Franciscans, founded by the Blessed Amadeus of Portugal, who served as confessor to Pope Sixtus IV from 1472. The church was rebuilt through the generous funding of Ferdinand and Isabella of Spain. It was consecrated in 1500 by Pope Alexander VI. 

It is a titular church, whose current title holder, since 1 March 2008, is Cardinal James Francis Stafford.

Interior

The church is decorated with artworks by prominent 16th- and 17th-century masters. 

Until 1797, Raphael's final masterpiece, the Transfiguration graced the high altar. At the start of the Napoleonic period, the altarpiece was expropriated by treaty by the French.  it is now in the Vatican pinacoteca. The altar currently displays a copy by Cammuccini of Guido Reni's Crucifixion of St. Peter (also now in Vatican museum). Although there is no grave marker, tradition has it that Beatrice Cenci—executed in 1599 for the murder of her abusive father and made famous by Percy Bysshe Shelley, among others—is buried below the high altar.

The first chapel on the right contains Sebastiano del Piombo's Flagellation and Transfiguration (1516–24). Michelangelo, who had befriended Sebastiano in Rome, supplied figure drawings that were incorporated into the Flagellation.

The second chapel has a fresco by Niccolò Circignani (1554), some Renaissance frescoes from the school of Pinturicchio, and an allegorical sibyl and virtue attributed to Baldassarre Peruzzi.

The fourth chapel has a ceiling fresco by Giorgio Vasari. 

The ceiling of the fifth chapel contains another fresco, the Conversion of St. Paul, by Vasari. The altarpiece is attributed to Giulio Mazzoni, while the funerary monument of Pope Julius III and Roberto Nobili are by Bartolomeo Ammannati. Also buried in the chapel is Julius III's scandalous 'nephew', Cardinal Innocenzo Ciocchi Del Monte.

The last chapel on the left contains a Baptism of Christ, attributed to Daniele da Volterra, and stucco-work and ceiling frescoes by Giulio Mazzoni.

A pupil of Antoniazzo Romano frescoed the third chapel with the Saint Anne, Virgin, and Child.

Dirck van Baburen, a central figure of the Dutch Caravaggisti, painted the Entombment for the Pietà Chapel, which is indebted to Caravaggio's example. Baburen worked with another Dutch artist, David de Haen in this chapel. The two other paintings, The Mocking of Christ and The Agony in the Garden are variously attributed to either or both of the artists.

The second chapel on the left, the Raimondi Chapel (1640), was designed by Gian Lorenzo Bernini. It includes Francesco Baratta's Saint Francis in Ecstasy and sculptures by Andrea Bolgi and Niccolò Sale.

Irish chieftains' tombs

At the high altar are two tombs: that of Hugh O'Neill, The O'Neill, 2nd Earl of Tyrone and his son Hugh who predeceased him, and the tomb shared by Rory O'Donnell, 1st Earl of Tyrconnell, and his brother Cathbharr, both of them younger brothers of Red Hugh O'Donnell.

These fled Ireland in 1607. Rory, Lord Tyrconnell, died in 1608, his brother Cathbharr ("Calfurnius" in the inscription) and Hugh, the son of the Great Earl, died in 1609. The cause of death in all cases was fever, probably malaria. Their tombs are covered with marble inscribed slabs with coloured borders, crests and shields. They are about 12 feet from the altar on the left as you face it and are normally covered by a carpet.

Lord Tyrone himself died in 1616 and was buried in the church with much less solemnity. The original simple tombstone was lost in about 1849, but the text of the short inscription was copied: "D.O.M. Hugonis principis ONelli ossa" (Dedicated to God the Best and Greatest. The bones of Prince Hugh O'Neill). In 1989, Tomás Cardinal Ó Fiaich laid a new marble plaque with the same inscription in approximately the original place.

The Tempietto

The so-called Tempietto (Italian: 'small temple') is a small commemorative tomb (martyrium) designed by Donato Bramante, possibly built as early as 1502 in the courtyard of San Pietro in Montorio. Commissioned by Ferdinand and Isabella of Spain, the Tempietto is considered a masterpiece of High Renaissance Italian architecture.

After spending his first years in Milan, Bramante moved to Rome, where he was recognized by Cardinal Giuliano della Rovere, the soon-to-be Pope Julius II. In Rome, Bramante was able to study the ancient monuments firsthand. The temple of Vesta at Tivoli was one of the precedents behind the Tempietto. Other antique precedents Bramante was able to study in Rome include the circular temple of the banks of the Tiber, Temple of Hercules Victor, believed at the time to be a temple of Vesta. However, circular churches had already been employed by early Christians for martyriums, like Santa Constanza, also in Rome. Bramante would have been aware of these early Christian precedents, and as a result, the Tempietto is circular.

The Tempietto is one of the most harmonious buildings of the Renaissance. The temple was constructed from bearing masonry. The circular temple supports a classical entablature, and was framed in the shadowy arch of the cloister. It is the earliest example of the Tuscan order in the Renaissance. The Tuscan is a form of the Doric order, well suited for strong male gods (such as Hercules) so Tuscan was well suited for St. Peter's. It is meant to mark the traditional exact spot of St. Peter's martyrdom, and is an important precursor to Bramante's rebuilding of St. Peter's.

Given all the transformations of Renaissance and Baroque Rome that were to follow, it is hard now to sense the impact this building had at the beginning of the 16th century. It is almost a piece of sculpture, for it has little architectonic use. The building greatly reflected Brunelleschi's style. Perfectly proportioned, it is composed of slender Tuscan columns, a Doric entablature modeled after the ancient Theater of Marcellus, and a dome. Bramante planned to surround the building with concentric rings of colonnades, the columns of which would have been radially aligned to those of the Tempietto, but this plan was never executed.

References

Sources

 Freiberg, Jack (2014), "Bramante's Tempietto, the Roman Renaissance, and the Spanish Crown", New York, Cambridge University Press, 2014.
Fortunato, Giuseppe (2010) "The Role of Architectural Representation in the Analysis of the Building: The 3d Survey of San Pietro in Montorio's Temple in Rome", atti del "X Congreso Internacional expresiòn gràphica aplicada a la edificacìon, Alicante, Editorial Marfil", S.A., .
  Satellite Photo The Tempietto is the circular dome in the center, enclosed tightly by the cloister of San Pietro in Montorio. Just west is the white hemicircle of the Acqua Paola.

External links
High-resolution 360° Panoramas and Images of San Pietro in Montorio | Art Atlas
High-resolution 360° Panoramas and Images of Tempietto | Art Atlas

Roman Catholic churches completed in 1500
Pietro in Montorio
Pietro in Montorio
Renaissance architecture in Rome
Church buildings with domes
Donato Bramante church buildings
Churches of Rome (rione Trastevere)